Tumpat (Kelantanese: Ttupak, Chinese: 道北) is a town, a district (jajahan) and parliamentary constituency in northern Kelantan, Malaysia, at the mouth of Kelantan River. 

Tumpat is situated at the end of the East Coast Line railway line operated by Keretapi Tanah Melayu (Malayan Railways) which links Kelantan to the southern and western part of Peninsular Malaysia. This strategic location makes it a transportation hub of Kelantan. Tumpat town is approximately 15 km from the state capital, Kota Bharu.

History
Tumpat district was established on 1 January 1949, detaching from Kota Bharu metropolitan area.

Geography
Tumpat is the northernmost constituency in Kelantan, bordering Thailand across the Golok River to the west, Kota Bharu across the Kelantan River to the east, and Pasir Mas to the south, and the Thai district of Tak Bai to the west.

Demographics 

Tumpat has a population about 152,168 (2010), with the majority being the Malays with significant Siamese, Indian and Chinese population.

Generally in Kelantan, the populations of Malaysian Indians are low but Tumpat is known to be the area where most Indians reside in Kelantan. During any Indian festivals, Indians around Kelantan gather there for community celebration events like Ponggal, Thaipusam & Deepavali. 

Ranking Population of Jajahan Tumpat:

Federal Parliament and State Assembly Seats 

List of LMS district representatives in the Federal Parliament (Dewan Rakyat)

List of LMS district representatives in the State Legislative Assembly of Kelantan

Tourist attractions

 Wat Machimmaram
 Wat Prachumthat Canaram
 Wat Phikulthong Vararam
 Wat Phothivihan
 Wat Mai Suwankhiri
 Pantai Sri Tujuh
 Pantai Suri
 Pantai Geting
 Pusat Bebas Cukai P.Kubor
 Makam Tok Janggut
 Masjid Kg Laut, Laman Warisan
 Masjid Ar Rahman Kubang Batang

Villages
 
 
Kampung Bechah Resak
Kampung Tok Uh
Kampung Geting
Kampung Laut
Kampung Ana
Kampung Kok Bedullah
Kampung Delima
Kampung Jambu
Kampung Jal Kecik
Kg Kutan
Kg Sungai Pinang

Transportation

Public transport
Tumpat is perhaps famous for being the northern terminal of the KTM East Coast Line, which began in Gemas in Negeri Sembilan. Bus options to Kota Bharu and Kuala Terengganu are available.

Car
The main federal highway serving Tumpat constituency is Federal Route 134, going from downtown Kota Bharu, crossing the Kelantan River and terminating at Pengkalan Kubur.

Climate
Tumpat has a tropical rainforest climate (Af) with moderate rainfall from February to April and heavy to very heavy rainfall in the remaining months.

Notable people
 Ibrahim Ali
Asyraf Wajdi Dusuki
 Pablo Amirul
 Z.Zamri
 Aedy Ashraf
 Saharul Ridzwan

References